Mladenović (meaning "Son of Mladen") is a surname often found in Serbia and Croatia. It may refer to:

Branko Mladenović, 14th century Serbian feudal lord, founder of the House of Branković
Dragan Mladenović :
Dragan Mladenović (born 1956), Yugoslav handballer
Dragan Mladenović (born 1963), Yugoslav handballer, Kristina Mladenovic's father
Dragan Mladenović (born 1976), Serbian footballer
Filip Mladenović (born 1991), Serbian footballer
Kristina Mladenovic (born 1993), French tennis player
Milan Mladenović (1958–1994), Serbian musician
Mladen Mladenović (born 1964), Croatian footballer
Nenad Mladenović (born 1976), Serbian footballer

Croatian surnames
Serbian surnames